Borg-Warner T-50 is a gearbox from Borg-Warner. It was used in the Chevrolet Monza and other 1970's H-body cars as well as the 76 and up 5 speed mid sized gm's.

Further reading
 V8 Monza Transmission FAQ
 List of transmissions, applications, and gear ratios

50